Subtranstillaspis is a genus of moths belonging to the family Tortricidae. It contains only one species, Subtranstillaspis hypochloris, which is found in Costa Rica.

References

Euliini
Taxa named by Józef Razowski
Monotypic moth genera
Moths of Central America
Tortricidae genera